Engandiyur  is a village in the Chavakkad taluka of the Thrissur district in the state of Kerala, India. It has an area of 1411 hectares and harbours 5,760 households with total population of 23,101 as per the 2011 Census. The nearest town Chavakkad is at a distance of 8 km. Male population is 10,528 and female population is 12,573. Scheduled Caste Population is 615 and Scheduled Tribes population is 45. Census Location Code of the village is 627789.

Location
This village shares borders with Orumanayur Panchayath on the north side and Vadanapilly Panchayath on the south side. On the west side is the Arabian Sea and to the east, Canoli Canal. The native language of Engandiyoor is Malayalam.

Economy
Engandiyur is another village much dependent on Persian Gulf countries for income. TIPPU SULTAN KOTTA, The famous Aayiram Kanni Temple, St. Thomas Church, Pokkulangara Temple, Thirumangalam Temple and St. Lourde Mary's Church are located in this panchayat. The famous Elephant Gajaraja shathriyan Shanmuka Priya Gaja Samrat Chulliparambil Vishnu Shankar (Height: 305  cm) is from this village, and there are also nine schools there; St. Thomas Higher Secondary School, St. Thomas LP School, National Higher Secondary School, Thriumangalm U P School, Paul Chitalapilly Memorial English Medium School, Thirunaarayana UP School, Sree Narayana UP School, and Saraswathy Vidya Nikethan Central School and Government Mappila Upper Primary School.

Engandiyur is well developed in education, literacy, health, employment and shelter. Engandiyur won the Swaraj Trophy award for Best Panchayat in Thrissur district twice consecutively (2012-2013 and 2013-2014).

Demographics
 India census, Engandiyur had a population of 22,449 with 10,232 males and 12,217 females.

Literacy 
 Total literate population: 19,832 (85.85%)
 Literate male population: 9,034 (85.81%)
 Literate female population: 10,798 (85.88%)

Educational Facilities 
There is one private Pre-primary School in the village.
There are seven government Primary Schools in the village. There is one private Primary School in the village.
There are four government Middle Schools in the village. There are two private Middle Schools in the village.
There are two government Secondary Schools in the village. There is one private Secondary School in the village.
There are three government Senior Secondary Schools in the village.

The nearest Degree College of Arts and Science and Commerce (Nattika) is at a distance of 5 to 10  km from the village.
The nearest Engineering College (Thrissur) is at a distance of more than 10  km from the village.
The nearest Medical College (Velappaya) is at a distance of more than 10  km from the village.
The nearest Management Institute (Thrissur) is at a distance of more than 10  km from the village.
The nearest Polytechnic (Nattika) is at a distance of 5 to 10  km from the village.
The nearest Vocational Training School (Thrissur) is at a distance of more than 10  km from the village.
The nearest Non-formal Training Centre (Thrissur) is at a distance of more than 10  km from the village.
The nearest Special School for Disabled (Thrissur) is at a distance of more than 10  km from the village.
The nearest other educational facilities (Thrissur) is at a distance of more than 10  km from the village.

Medical Facilities

Hospitals
Mary Immaculate Hospital
T.M Hospital
Well care Hospital

Government
The nearest community health centre is at a distance of less than 5  km from the village.
There is one primary health centre in the village.
There is one primary health sub-centre in the village.
There is one maternity and child welfare centre in the village.
The nearest T.B. clinic is at a distance of more than 10  km from the village.
The nearest allopathy hospital is at a distance of 5 to 10  km from the village.
The nearest alternative medicine hospital is at a distance of 5 to 10  km from the village.
There are three dispensaries in the village.
There is one veterinary hospital in the village.
The nearest mobile health clinic is at a distance of more than 10  km from the village.
There is one family welfare centre in the village.

Transportation
The nearest airport is Cochin International Airport, Kochi - 65 km distant. The nearest railway stations are at Thrissur (20  km) and Guruvayoor (8  km). NH-66 passes through the middle of the village and also two parallel roads on either side of NH named east and west Tippu Sulthan roads are there. Also, a mini harbour located at north-west of the village mainly used for fishing.

Auto/Modified Auto is available in the village. Public bus service is available in the village. Private bus service is available in the village.

Communication
The post office is available in the village. Village pin code is 680615. Telephone via landline is available.
Public call office is available in the village. Mobile phone coverage is available in the village. The nearest Private courier is at a distance of less than 5  km from the village.

Taxi is available in the village.
The village is connected to a national highway
The nearest state highway is at a distance of less than 5  km from the village.

Drinking Water
Water from treated and untreated tap water is available in the village.
Water from only uncovered wells is available in the village.
Water from hand pumps and tube wells / Borewells is available in the village.

Economy
The main source of economy is foreign money from the persons who are working in Gulf countries, fishing and farming are another major sources of economy. People earn money by selling shells, crab, fish, etc..

Sanitation
Only open drainage is available in the village.
Drain water is discharged directly into the sewer plant.
The area is covered under the Total Sanitation Campaign (TSC).
Community toilet including bath is not available in the village.
Community toilet excluding bath is not available in the village.

Market and Banking 
There are plenty of banks available in this village. Canara bank and federal bank have their branches in Pokkulangara with ATM facility and South Indian bank have their branch in anjamkallu with ATM facility.
Commercial Bank is available in the village.
Co-operative Bank is available in the village.
Agricultural Credit Society is available in the village.
Self-Help Group is available in the village.
Public distribution system (PDS) shop is available in the village. The nearest Weekly Haat is at a distance of 5 to 10  km from the village.
The nearest Agricultural marketing society is at a distance of 5 to 10  km from the village.

Municipal facilities 
The nearest Integrated Child Development Scheme (Nutritional Centre) is at a distance of 5 to 10  km from the village.
Anganwadi Centre (Nutritional Centre) is available in the village.
ASHA (Accredited Social Health Activist) is available in the village.
Sports Field is available in the village.
Cinema / Video Hall is available in the village.
Public Library is available in the village.
Public Reading Room is available in the village.
Newspaper Supply is available in the village.
Assembly Polling station is available in the village.
Birth and Death Registration Office is available in the village.

Electricity 
Almost all homes are electrified in this village. Street lights also in sufficient numbers for providing good lighting.

Land Use 
Engandiyur exhibits the following land use pattern (area in hectares):

 Area under non-agricultural Uses: 157.13
 Net Area Sown: 1253.87
 Total Un-irrigated Land Area: 1049.66
 Area irrigated by source: 204.21

Ecology 
East side of the village covered by canoly canal and west side by Arabian sea. Estuaries are the most big treasure of this village. Presence of Mangrove vegetation was also home to many organisms.

Salt Water Intrusion

Salt water intrusion is the main issue in this area. Saltwater will enter into the farming lands and household water resources in the summer season. Proper maintaining of Meenkadav Bund, Enamakkal bund, which is the main check dam of the village may reduce this problem.

Irrigation facilities 
Sources of irrigation are as follows (area in hectares):

 Wells/Tube-wells: 83.77
 Others: 120.44

Notable people

This village is well known by its vast literal and cultural features. Many personalities include:
 
Others include 
 Fr.Paul Chittilappilly, the Renaissance leader in the field of health and education of Engandiyur. 
 V. S. Keraleeyan, notable freedom fighter; Malayala Maharshi also belongs to this village; 
 Bro. V. K. Velukutty Master is the person who started night study classes and literacy programme in this panchayath and was the first man who brought a bicycle to this village.

References

External links
 www.engandiyur.com - A website all about Engandiyur Village/Panchayath

Villages in Thrissur district